Angathattu is a 1974 Indian Malayalam-language film directed by T. R. Raghunath and produced by M. Azim. The film stars Prem Nazir, Adoor Bhasi, Thikkurissy Sukumaran Nair and Jose Prakash in the lead roles. The film had musical score by G. Devarajan.

Plot

Cast

Prem Nazir as Kadathanadan Ambadi
Vijayasree as Aarcha
Adoor Bhasi as Karuppan
Thikkurissy Sukumaran Nair as Nangar
K. P. Ummer as Thacholi Ambu
Sankaradi as Kochukuruppu
Kaviyoor Ponnamma as Kunjukutty
Jose Prakash
Sreelatha Namboothiri as  Malu
T. S. Muthaiah as Choyi
Paul Vengola 
Bahadoor as Chandunni
Sadhana
Kaduvakulam Antony as Transilater
N. Govindankutty as Panacheri kuruppu
Paravoor Bharathan
Meena as Kaavu
Usharani as Chinnu

Soundtrack
The music was composed by G. Devarajan and the lyrics were written by Vayalar Ramavarma.

References

External links
 

1974 films
1970s Malayalam-language films
Films directed by T. R. Raghunath